Quaker Lake is a lake located south of Coldspring, New York. Fish species present in the lake are rainbow trout, brown trout, brook trout, and black bullhead. There is a state owned carry down launch located in Allegany State Park off NY-280. The state park also offers a swimming area and facilities on the lake.

Quaker Lake was constructed in the 1960s, one of the byproducts of the Kinzua Dam construction. A spillway across Route 280 empties the lake into the Allegheny Reservoir.

References 

Lakes of Cattaraugus County, New York
Lakes of New York (state)